Magdaléna Rybáriková was the defending champion, having won the previous event in 2008, however she chose not to participate.

Qualifier Jeļena Ostapenko won the title, defeating Patricia Maria Țig in the final, 3–6, 7–5, 6–2.

Seeds

Main draw

Finals

Top half

Bottom half

References 
 Main draw on ITF site
 Qualifying Draw on ITF site

Ladies Neva Cup - Singles
St. Petersburg Ladies' Trophy